Urban Search and Rescue Virginia Task Force 1 or VA-TF1 is a FEMA Urban Search and Rescue Task Force based in Fairfax County, Virginia. VA-TF1 is sponsored by the Fairfax County Fire and Rescue Department.

Established in 1986 as a domestic and international disaster response resource, sponsored by the Fairfax County Fire and Rescue Department, Virginia Task Force 1 is rostered by approximately 200 specially trained career and volunteer fire and rescue personnel, with expertise in the rescue of victims from collapsed structures, following natural disasters or terrorist attacks.

The team is composed of emergency managers and planners, physicians and paramedics, and specialists in the fields of structural engineering, heavy rigging, collapse rescue, logistics, hazardous materials, communications, canine and technical search.

Virginia Task Force 1 has partnerships with the Department of Homeland Security's Federal Emergency Management Agency for domestic responses and the United States Agency for International Development’s Bureau for Humanitarian Assistance to provide international responses to natural and man-made disasters. As a part of the Fairfax County Fire and Rescue Department, the task force maintains constant operational readiness as a local resource for residents of Fairfax County and surrounding jurisdictions.

Deployments 
As of March 2023, VA-TF1 has taken part in the following deployments:

References

External links 
 Virginia Task Force 1

Virginia 1
Fairfax County, Virginia
2010 Haiti earthquake relief
Organizations established in 1986
1986 establishments in Virginia